Sasyr (Saahır) is a rural locality (a selo), the only inhabited locality, and the administrative center of Ulakhan-Chistaysky National Rural Okrug of Momsky District in the Sakha Republic, Russia, located  from Khonuu, the administrative center of the district. Its population as of the 2010 Census was 713, of whom 364 were male and 349 female, down from 772 recorded during the 2002 Census.

It is the nearest village to Moma Natural Park.

References

Notes

Sources
Official website of the Sakha Republic. Registry of the Administrative-Territorial Divisions of the Sakha Republic. Momsky District. 

Rural localities in Momsky District